Pumpkin bombs were conventional aerial bombs developed by the Manhattan Project and used by the United States Army Air Forces against Japan during World War II. It was a close replication of the Fat Man plutonium bomb with the same ballistic and handling characteristics, but it used non-nuclear conventional high explosives. It was mainly used for testing and training purposes, which included combat missions flown with pumpkin bombs by the 509th Composite Group. The name "pumpkin bomb" was the term used in official documents from the large, fat ellipsoidal shape of the munition casing instead of the more usual cylindrical shape of other bombs, intended to enclose the Fat Man's spherical "physics package" (the plutonium implosion nuclear weapon core).

Development 
Pumpkin bombs were a means of providing realistic training with non-nuclear bombs for the 509th Composite Group's Boeing B-29 Superfortress crews assigned to drop the atomic bomb. The pumpkin bomb had a similar size and weight distribution as a Fat Man plutonium bomb, giving it the same ballistic and handling characteristics. Specifications for the bomb required that it be carried in the forward bomb bay of a Silverplate B-29 bomber and be fuzed to be effective against actual targets.

Pumpkin bombs were produced in both inert and high-explosive variants. The filler of both variants had the same weight and weight distribution as the inner spherical "physics package" of the Fat Man plutonium bomb.

The concept for the high-explosive pumpkin bomb was originated in December 1944 by United States Navy Captain William S. Parsons, the head of the Ordnance Division at Manhattan Project's Los Alamos Laboratory, and United States Army Air Forces Lieutenant Colonel Paul W. Tibbets, commander of the 509th Composite Group. Prior testing was carried out with an inert version.

The name "pumpkin bomb" originated with Parsons and Dr. Charles C. Lauritsen of the California Institute of Technology, who managed the development team. The name was used for the training bombs in official meetings and documents, and probably derived from its large ellipsoidal shape. On the other hand, anecdotal sources attribute the naming of the bombs to a pumpkin color: While the bombs were painted olive drab or khaki in the field, photographs show that at least the units delivered to Tinian were shipped in the same yellow zinc chromate primer color worn by Fat Man.

While many Manhattan scientists expected that the development of the means of delivery of the atomic bomb would be straightforward, Parsons, with his experience of the proximity fuze program, expected that it would involve considerable effort. The test program was initiated on 13 August 1943 at the Naval Proving Ground in Dahlgren, Virginia, where a scale model of the Fat Man plutonium bomb was developed. On 3 March 1944, testing moved to Muroc Army Air Field, California. The initial tests demonstrated that the Fat Man assembly was unstable in flight, and that its fuzes did not work properly.

Production 
The shells of the pumpkin bomb were manufactured by two Los Angeles firms, Consolidated Steel Corporation and Western Pipe and Steel Company, while the 'California Parachute' tail assembly was produced by Centerline Company of Detroit. After initial development, management of the program was turned over to the U.S. Navy Bureau of Ordnance in May 1945. A total of 486 live and inert training bombs were eventually delivered, at a cost of between $1,000 and $2,000 apiece.

All of the inert versions went from the manufacturers directly to Wendover Army Air Field, Utah, by rail, where they were used by the 216th Base Unit in flight testing of the bomb. Some test drop missions were flown by the 509th Composite Group's 393d Bombardment Squadron as training exercises. The bombs intended as live ordnance were shipped to the Naval Ammunition Depot, McAlester, Oklahoma, for filling with explosives. The Composition B was poured as a slurry, solidified in a drying facility for 36 hours, sealed, and shipped by railroad to the Port Chicago Naval Magazine, California, for shipment by sea to Tinian.

Description
The pumpkin bombs were externally similar to the Fat Man bomb in size and shape, and both had the same  California Parachute square tail assembly and single-point attachment lug. The pumpkin bomb had three contact fuzes arranged in an equilateral triangle around the nose of the bomb while the atomic bomb had four fuse housings. The atomic bomb had its shell sections bolted together and sealed with externally-applied, sprayed-on liquid asphalt, but most if not all of the pumpkin bombs were welded, with a four-inch hole used for filling the shell. The Fat Man also had four external mounting points for radar antennas which the pumpkin bombs did not have.

The shells were made of  steel plate and the tail assemblies from  aluminum plate.

Combat missions
Combat missions were flown by the 509th Composite Group on 20, 23, 26 and 29 July and 8 and 14 August 1945, using the bombs against individual targets in Japanese cities. A total of 49 bombs were dropped on 14 targets, one bomb was jettisoned into the ocean, and two were aboard aircraft that aborted their missions.

Mission parameters and protocols were similar to those of the actual atomic bomb missions, and all targets were located in the vicinity of the cities designated for atomic attack. After the war, the Strategic Bombing Survey concluded that the pumpkin bombs were "a reasonably effective weapon against Japanese plants when direct hits were scored on vital areas, or when the near miss was sufficiently close to important buildings to cause severe structural damage."

Notes

References
 
 
 

World War II aerial bombs of the United States
History of the Manhattan Project
Atomic bombings of Hiroshima and Nagasaki
Nuclear warfare